Slieve Rushen Wind Farm is an 18-turbine wind farm in County Fermanagh, Northern Ireland, with a total capacity of 54 MW, enough to power over 30,000 homes. It was commissioned in April 2008.

See also

Wind power in the United Kingdom
List of onshore wind farms

References

Wind farms in Northern Ireland